Into the Badlands is an American television series that premiered on November 15, 2015, on AMC. Into the Badlands has been described as "a high-octane sci-fi martial arts series" and as a "post-apocalyptic drama". The series follows a warrior and a young boy who journey through a dangerous feudal land together seeking enlightenment. On February 9, 2019, AMC canceled the show after three seasons. The series finale aired on May 6, 2019.

Premise

In a postapocalyptic world approximately 500 years in the future, war has left civilization in ruins. Some elements of technology, such as electricity and ground vehicles, have survived the apocalypse, but society now shuns firearms, leading to a reliance on melee weaponry and crossbows.

In a territory known as the Badlands, encompassing several states located between the Rocky Mountains and Mississippi River, a feudal society has developed to fill the power vacuum left by the war. Barons control land and monopolies over commodities like opium and fuel, trading amongst themselves to maintain the peace. Each baron is served by a massive workforce of slaves called cogs, as well as a prostitute class called dolls. A baron maintains power through an army of young men and women called clippers: highly trained and loyal warriors, clippers are forbidden from marrying and having children lest their loyalties be divided. Each clipper force is captained by a regent.

Several groups exist outside the strict hierarchy of the barons. Nomads are the most common, mostly lawless homicidal bandits who subsist on stealing from trade convoys between the baronies but some live in organized clans. The River King and his men control water trade in the Badlands and beyond, and is considered a neutral party in the barons' power struggles. An ascetic religious movement called the Totemists is also shown to exist on the fringes of society, living in isolated communities and practicing a form of idol worship. The Widow leads a revolutionary group of anti-feudal fighters from her late husband's barony; although nominally recognized as a baron by her peers, they do not respect her, and the contempt is mutual.

Little is known of the world beyond the Badlands, but it is implied that it is far less politically stable yet environmentally sound like the Badlands. The mythical utopian city of Azra is believed to exist outside the Badlands, but most dismiss it as a legend.

Cast and characters

Main
 Daniel Wu as Sunny, regent (head clipper) to the Badlands' most powerful baron, Quinn. Despite being a man of conviction, he is very loyal to Quinn. Very skilled and proficient in various styles and weapons, he is considered to be one of the deadliest clippers in the Badlands. Veil's lover and Henry's father.
 Orla Brady as Lydia, Quinn's first wife, who is both his fiercest critic and most devoted follower. She partners with The Widow and becomes her Viceroy and takes over Quinn's mansion. She adopts a horse for her Baronial symbol, shown in white on a green banner, and continues to produce opium poppies.
 Sarah Bolger as Jade (seasons 1–2), Quinn's new wife-to-be, whose beguiling demeanor hides a core of ambition and tenacity which she uses to manipulate others. She later marries her step-son, Ryder, after Quinn's presumed death.
 Aramis Knight as M.K., a seemingly average teenage boy who is anything but. Lurking inside him is a dark energy that the Widow wants to harness into a weapon.
 Emily Beecham as Minerva, better known as The Widow, the Badlands' newest baron; a brilliant martial artist. She has adopted a blue-winged butterfly as her baronial symbol, shown in yellow on a light blue banner. It represents a transformation from insignificance to beauty and power. Her territory produces crude oil.
 Oliver Stark as Ryder (seasons 1–2), Quinn's only son and presumed heir. Ryder later takes over as baron after his father's presumed death along with marrying his step-mother, Jade.
 Madeleine Mantock as Veil (seasons 1–2), a doctor who is in a secret relationship with Sunny. Henry's mother 
 Ally Ioannides as Tilda, a teenage assassin well-trained in the martial arts, she is the Widow's adopted daughter and later becomes her regent. At the end of Season 2 she has abandoned Minerva's cause and started a renegade band of bandits in Season 3 who steal precious supplies across the Badlands under the alias as their leader called "Iron Rabbit".
 Marton Csokas as Quinn (seasons 1–2), the Badlands' preeminent baron and a former clipper. His baronial symbol is an armadillo shown in white on a maroon banner. His territory produces opium poppy, which are harvested for opium.
 Nick Frost as Bajie (seasons 2–3), a schemer with questionable morals who finds himself allied with Sunny. Based on Zhu Bajie.
 Lorraine Toussaint as Cressida (season 3), high priestess of Pilgrim and his followers.
 Babou Ceesay as Pilgrim (season 3), a self-described "Son of Azra". He is the leader of the Totemists, worshipers who are with him to recreate Azra in the Badlands. Can control those with the Gift, including Nix, Castor and M.K. His real name is Taurin and he is one of the last survivors of Azra alongside Sunny and Kannin.
 Ella-Rae Smith as Nix (season 3), a member of Pilgrim's followers who has the Gift. She is close friends with Castor.
 Sherman Augustus as Nathaniel Moon (season 3; guest season 2), a former clipper who fights with honor, looking for his 1000th Clip. Battled Sunny; after he lost, wanted to be killed but lost his hand instead. He becomes the Widow's regent, and is tasked with tracking down Sunny.

Recurring
 Mike Seal as Petri, one of Quinn's clippers. (season 1)
 Stephen Lang as Waldo, a paraplegic former regent serving under Quinn (season 1) and the Widow (season 2)
 Teressa Liane as Angelica, a prostitute, and spy loyal to The Widow. (season 1)
 Edi Gathegi as Baron Jacobee, who has an alliance with Quinn. His baronial colors are a pattern of blue and green plaid. (season 1)
 Lance E. Nichols as the River King, an importer and exporter of goods and cogs (indentured servants) up and down the river through the Badlands. (seasons 1 and 3)
 Lance Henriksen as Penrith, Lydia's father and the leader of a Totemist religious commune (seasons 1–2)
 Cung Le as Cyan, head Abbott who journeys with his fellow Abbotts, Ramona and Dury, searching for those who have abilities. (seasons 1-2)
 Eve Connolly as Ava, an fighting instructor who works with M.K. (season 2)
 Stephen Walters as the Engineer, boss of the pickers (miners) in the Bordeaux Mines. (season 2)
 Chipo Chung as the Master, leader of the Abbott who trains M.K., teaching him how to control his abilities (seasons 2–3)
 Maddison Jaizani as Odessa, a former Doll who becomes one of The Widow's Butterflies, and later is Tilda's lover. (seasons 2–3)
 Eleanor Matsuura as Baron Juliet Chau, who wants Quinn dead. She has adopted a fox as her baronial symbol, shown in black on a cream colored banner. Her baronial color is mostly white. (seasons 2–3)
 Dean-Charles Chapman as Castor, a member of Pilgrim's followers who has the Gift. Is friends with Nix. (season 3)
 Lewis Tan as Gaius Chau, brother of Juliet Chau who has childhood history with Minerva. (season 3)
 Thom Ashley as Eli, a novice fighter who possesses the gift. Is friends with M.K. (Season 3) 
 Sophia Di Martino as Lily, a smuggler and Bajie's ex-wife. (season 3)
 Eugenia Yuan as Kannin, Sunny's sister and a member of the Black Lotus. (season 3)

Episodes

Series overview

Season 1 (2015)

Season 2 (2017)

Season 3 (2018–19)

Production
Described as a "genre-bending martial arts series", the story is loosely based on the classic Chinese tale Journey to the West. AMC ordered six one-hour-long episodes of the action-drama developed by AMC Studios for a premiere in late 2015. Executive producer Stephen Fung also serves as the series' action director alongside veteran Hong Kong choreographer, Ku Huen-chiu. AMC renewed the show for a 10-episode second season, which premiered on March 19, 2017. On April 25, 2017, AMC renewed the series for a 16-episode third season which premiered nearly a year later on April 22, 2018.

The series was filmed in Louisiana for the first season but production then moved to Ireland, shooting around Dublin and County Wicklow.  

On February 9, 2019, AMC canceled the series after three seasons.

Broadcast
Internationally, the series premiered in Australia on November 17, 2015, on Showcase. In Germany, Austria, Italy, and the UK, the series is available through Amazon Prime Instant Video with each episode accessible the day after the U.S. air date. BBC America began airing double episodes on August 20, 2016, at 10pm ET.

Home media

Reception

Critical response
The first season received mixed reviews from critics. The review aggregator website Rotten Tomatoes reported a 54% approval rating with an average rating of 4.72/10 based on 39 reviews. The website's critical consensus reads, "Into the Badlands is loaded with off-kilter potential that's left largely unfulfilled -- although its well-choreographed action sequences should satisfy martial arts fans." Metacritic, which uses a weighted average, assigned a score of 54 out of 100 based on 29 critics, indicating "mixed or average reviews".

The second season received positive reviews from critics. Rotten Tomatoes reports a 100% approval rating with an average rating of 7.53/10 based on 6 reviews.

The third season also received favorable reviews. Rotten Tomatoes reports an 88% approval based on 8 reviews.

Tim Goodman of The Hollywood Reporter gave a generally positive review and wrote, "AMC finds a bloody, fun and entertaining non-zombie counterpart to The Walking Dead and turns Sundays into an escapist red zone." Maureen Ryan of Variety wrote,
The action scenes scattered throughout Into the Badlands are not just stirringly presented, they represent a test passed with flying, and bloody, colors. This efficient AMC series is an homage to classic Samurai films and kinetic action fare churned out by Hong Kong maestros of furious fists, and if the TV drama had failed to meet the standards set by the sturdiest examples of those genres, it would have seemed superfluous at best. Fortunately, star Daniel Wu is more than up to the task of occupying the center of this streamlined story of vengeance, tyranny and roundhouse kicks.

Ratings

Season 1

Season 2

Season 3

Accolades

Notes

References

External links
 
 
 Into the Badlands  on TV.com

2010s American drama television series
2015 American television series debuts
2019 American television series endings
AMC (TV channel) original programming
American action adventure television series
American action television series
Dystopian television series
English-language television shows
Martial arts television series
Post-apocalyptic television series
Television series by Entertainment One
Wuxia television series
Television shows filmed in Louisiana
Television shows filmed in the Republic of Ireland
Television series created by Alfred Gough
Television series created by Miles Millar